The Mythology of All Races is a 13-volume book series edited by Louis Herbert Gray between 1916–1932 with George Foot Moore as a consulting editor.

Volumes

See also
Columbia University Indo-Iranian Series

External links

Series of books
Mythology books